San Román is one of three parishes in Sariego, a municipality within the province and autonomous community of Asturias, in northern Spain.

The postal code is 33518.

Villages
 Acéu
 Figares
 San Román
 Valvidares

See also
Church of San Román (Sariego)

References

Parishes in Sariego